BBC Sessions by The Who was released 15 February 2000 on Polydor Records internationally and MCA Records in the U.S. It contains 24 songs and two jingles recorded live at the BBC studios in London.

With the exception of the jingles being used to bookend the album, and the third track being misplaced, The Who's recordings are presented in chronological order. Most of the recordings are for the programmes Top Gear or Saturday Club and were recorded between 24 May 1965 and 10 October 1967. Tracks 20-23 were recorded on 14 April 1970 for the Dave Lee Travis Show while tracks 24-25 were recorded on 29 January 1973 for The Old Grey Whistle Test.

Track listing 
All tracks written by Pete Townshend except where noted. Due to publishing restrictions, the American version dropped "Man with the Money" and edited out the few lines from "Spoonful" contained in "Shakin' All Over".

Recording and broadcast details
Tracks 2, 4, and 5 recorded 24 May 1965, at Aeolian Hall, London.
Broadcast on Saturday Club, 29 May 1965.
Produced by Jimmy Grant and Brian Willey.
Track 3 recorded 15 June 1965, at Aeolian Hall, London.
Broadcast on Top Gear, 19 June 1965.
Produced by Bernie Andrews.
Tracks 6, 7, and 8 recorded 22 November 1965, at Aeolian Hall, London.
Broadcast on Saturday Club, 27 November 1965.
Produced by Jimmy Grant & Brian Willey.
Tracks 9, 10, and 11 recorded 15 March 1966, at Aeolian Hall, London.
Broadcast on Saturday Club, 19 March 1966.
Produced by Jimmy Grant & Brian Willey.
Tracks 12 and 13 recorded 13 September 1966, at the BBC Playhouse Theatre, Westminster, London.
Broadcast on Saturday Club, 17 September 1966.
Produced by Jimmy Grant & Brian Willey.
Tracks 14, 15, 16, and 17 recorded 17 January 1967, at the BBC Playhouse Theatre, London.
Broadcast on Saturday Club, 21 January 1967.
Produced by Bill Bebb & Jimmy Grant.
Tracks 1, 18, 19, and 26 recorded 10 October 1967, at De Lane Lea Studios, Kingsway, London.
Broadcast on Top Gear, 15 October 1967.
Produced by Bernie Andrews & Bev Phillips.
Tracks 20, 21, 22, and 23 recorded 13 April 1970, at IBC Studios, London.
Broadcast on the Dave Lee Travis show, 19 April 1970.
Produced by Paul Williams.
Tracks 24 and 25 recorded 29 January 1973, at the BBC Television Centre, Wood Lane, London, using previously recorded backing tracks.
Broadcast on The Old Grey Whistle Test, BBC Two, 30 January 1973.
Produced by Michael Appleton.

References

External links
 BBC Sessions liner notes – Song-by-song liner notes for the album

BBC Radio recordings
The Who live albums
The Who compilation albums
2000 live albums
2000 compilation albums
MCA Records compilation albums
MCA Records live albums
Polydor Records compilation albums
Polydor Records live albums